This list of museums in Kent, England contains museums which are defined for this context as institutions (including nonprofit organizations, government entities, and private businesses) that collect and care for objects of cultural, artistic, scientific, or historical interest and make their collections or related exhibits available for public viewing. Also included are non-profit art galleries and university art galleries.  Museums that exist only in cyberspace (i.e., virtual museums) are not included.

Museums

Defunct museums
 Ashford Steam Centre, Willesborough, Kent. In operation 1968–76.
 Charles Dickens Centre, Rochester, closed in 2004
 Dolphin Sailing Barge Museum, Sittingbourne, closed after a fire in 2009
 Farming World, Boughton under Blean, closed in 2014
 Kent Fire and Rescue Service Museum, Maidstone
 Manston Fire Museum, Manston, closed in 2014
 White Cliff Experience, Dover

See also
 :Category:Tourist attractions in Kent

References

Visit Britain: Museums & Galleries in Kent

 
Kent
Museums